Duri Camichel (6 May 1982 – 28 April 2015) was a Swiss professional ice hockey player.

Camichel died in a traffic collision in Costa Rica.

His father Werner Camichel was a bobsledder at the 1972 Winter Olympics.

References

External links

1982 births
2015 deaths
EV Zug players
SC Rapperswil-Jona Lakers players
Swiss ice hockey forwards
Road incident deaths in Costa Rica